Thomas Mckay is an American Republican politician from Alaska. He has represented District 24 as a Member of the Alaska House of Representatives since 2021.

References

External links 
 Thomas McKay at Ballotpedia

Living people
Republican Party members of the Alaska House of Representatives
21st-century American politicians
Year of birth missing (living people)